A woodward is a warden of a wood. Woodward may also refer to:

Places
United States
 Woodward, Iowa
 Woodward, Oklahoma
 Woodward, Pennsylvania, a census-designated place
 Woodward Avenue, a street in Tallahassee, Florida, which bisects the campus of Florida State University
 Woodward Avenue, a Michigan state highway
 Woodward Corridor, a neighborhood in Detroit, Michigan
 Woodward County, Oklahoma
 Woodward Park (disambiguation), multiple places
 Woodward Pond, a man-made pond in Bowie, Maryland
 Woodward Township, Pennsylvania (disambiguation), multiple places

People
 Woodward (surname)

Businesses
 Woodward, Inc., American maker of energy devices
 Woodward & Lothrop, American department store chain
 Woodward Iron Company, in Birmingham (Woodward) Alabama
 Woodward's, Canadian department store chain
 The Woodward's building in Vancouver, British Columbia

Education
 Woodward Academy, a private school in Georgia (United States)
 Woodward High School (Cincinnati, Ohio), one of the oldest public high schools still in operation in the United States
 Woodward School for Girls, a private school in Quincy, Massachusetts (United States)

Other uses
 1947 Glazier–Higgins–Woodward tornadoes
 Dartmouth College v. Woodward, an 1819 U.S. Supreme Court case
 Woodward Camp, a youth summer camp in Pennsylvania
 Woodward Dream Cruise, a classic car event held in Michigan
 Woodward–Hoffmann rules, possible predictors of the stereochemistry of pericyclic reactions

See also 
 Woodard (disambiguation) (note different spelling)
 Justice Woodward (disambiguation)
Woodyard (disambiguation)